Acetoin, also known as 3-hydroxybutanone or acetyl methyl carbinol, is an organic compound with the formula CH3CH(OH)C(O)CH3.  It is a colorless liquid with a pleasant, buttery odor. It is chiral. The form produced by bacteria is (R)-acetoin.

Production in bacteria
Acetoin is a neutral, four-carbon molecule used as an external energy store by a number of fermentative bacteria. It is produced by the decarboxylation of alpha-acetolactate, a common precursor in the biosynthesis of branched-chain amino acids. Owing to its neutral nature, production and excretion of acetoin during exponential growth prevents over-acidification of the cytoplasm and the surrounding medium that would result from accumulation of acidic metabolic products, such as acetic acid and citric acid.  Once superior carbon sources are exhausted, and the culture enters stationary phase, acetoin can be used to maintain the culture density. The conversion of acetoin into acetyl-CoA is catalysed by the acetoin dehydrogenase complex, following a mechanism largely analogous to the pyruvate dehydrogenase complex; however, as acetoin is not a 2-oxoacid, it does not undergo decarboxylation by the E1 enzyme; instead, a molecule of acetaldehyde is released. 
In some bacteria, acetoin can also be reduced to 2,3-butanediol by acetoin reductase/2,3-butanediol dehydrogenase.

The Voges-Proskauer test is a commonly used microbiological test for acetoin production.

Uses

Food ingredients
Acetoin, along with diacetyl, is one of the compounds that gives butter its characteristic flavor. Because of this, manufacturers of partially hydrogenated oils typically add artificial butter flavor – acetoin and diacetyl – (along with beta carotene for the yellow color) to the final product.

Acetoin can be found in apples, yogurt, asparagus, blackcurrants, blackberries, wheat, broccoli, brussels sprouts, cantaloupes, and maple syrup.

Acetoin is used as a food flavoring (in baked goods) and as a fragrance.

Electronic cigarettes
It is used in liquids for electronic cigarettes to give a buttery or caramel flavor.

See also
 Diacetyl
 Acetylpropionyl

References

Acyloins
Flavors
Perfume ingredients